Consider a dynamical system

(1)..........

(2)..........

Assume that the system (1) gives, for any fixed , an asymptotically stable solution .

(3)..........

It permits reducing high-dimensional dynamical problems to lower dimensions and underlies Alfred Marshall's temporary equilibrium method.

References

 https://epub.ub.uni-muenchen.de/39121/

Economics theorems